Robert or Bob Berman may refer to:
Bob Berman, American astronomer and science popularizer
Bob Berman (baseball) (1899–1988), American Major League catcher
Robert Berman (banker), American banker, co-founder of Neuberger Berman
Robert A. Berman (born 1959), American businessman of Monticello Raceway and Empire Resorts
Robert J. Berman, Swedish mathematical scientist

See also
Bob Burman (1884–1916), American racecar driver